Robidnica is a small settlement above the village of Leskovica in the Municipality of Gorenja Vas–Poljane in the Upper Carniola region of Slovenia.

References

External links 

Robidnica on Geopedia

Populated places in the Municipality of Gorenja vas-Poljane